Anaxita vetusta is a moth of the family Erebidae first described by Embrik Strand in 1911. It is found in Peru.

References

Phaegopterina
Moths described in 1911
Moths of South America